Ansbach is an electoral constituency (German: Wahlkreis) represented in the Bundestag. It elects one member via first-past-the-post voting. Under the current constituency numbering system, it is designated as constituency 241. It is located in western Bavaria, comprising the city of Ansbach and the districts of Landkreis Ansbach and Weißenburg-Gunzenhausen.

Ansbach was created for the inaugural 1949 federal election. Since 2017, it has been represented by Artur Auernhammer of the Christian Social Union (CSU).

Geography
Ansbach is located in western Bavaria. As of the 2021 federal election, it comprises the independent city of Ansbach and the districts of Landkreis Ansbach and Weißenburg-Gunzenhausen.

History
Ansbach was created in 1949. In the 1949 election, it was Bavaria constituency 30 in the numbering system. In the 1953 through 1961 elections, it was number 225. In the 1965 through 1998 elections, it was number 227. In the 2002 and 2005 elections, it was number 242. Since the 2009 election, it has been number 241.

Originally, the constituency comprised the independent cities of Ansbach and Rothenburg ob der Tauber and the districts of Landkreis Ansbach, Feuchtwangen, Landkreis Rothenburg ob der Tauber, and Uffenheim. In the 1965 through 1972 elections, it lost the Feuchtwangen district while gaining the independent city of Schwabach and Landkreis Schwabach district. In the 1976 through 1987 elections, it comprised the city of Ansbach and Landkreis Ansbach district. It acquired its current borders in the 1990 election.

Members
The constituency has been held continuously by the Christian Social Union (CSU) since its creation. It was first represented by Friedrich Bauereisen from 1949 to 1961, followed by Georg Ehnes from 1961 to 1972. Carl-Dieter Spranger was then representative from 1972 to 2002, a total of eight consecutive terms. Josef Göppel then served from 2002 to 2017. Artur Auernhammer was elected in 2017 and re-elected in 2021.

Election results

2021 election

2017 election

2013 election

2009 election

References

Federal electoral districts in Bavaria
1949 establishments in West Germany
Constituencies established in 1949
Ansbach
Ansbach (district)
Weißenburg-Gunzenhausen